The 1970–71 season was the 91st season of competitive football by Rangers.

Overview
Rangers played a total of 53 competitive matches during the 1970–71 season. The season was largely overshadowed by the Second Ibrox disaster when 66 people were crushed to death on Stairway 13 of Ibrox Park following an Old Firm game on 2 January 1971.

Results 

All results are written with Rangers' score first.

Scottish First Division

Inter-Cities Fairs Cup

Scottish Cup

League Cup

Appearances

See also
 1970–71 in Scottish football
 1970–71 Scottish Cup
 1970–71 Scottish League Cup
 1970–71 Inter-Cities Fairs Cup

References

Rangers F.C. seasons
Rangers